The War Tour was a concert tour by the Irish rock band U2, which took place in 1982 and 1983 in support of the group's third album War. The tour took place in Western Europe, the United States, Canada and Japan, with new material from War taking an increasing role as the tour progressed. Venues were mostly halls, but some arenas were introduced later on. U2's performances were very well received both critically and commercially, especially in the United States where U2 broke through to become a major act. Scenes of lead singer Bono waving a white flag during the song "Sunday Bloody Sunday" became an emblematic image of this phase of U2's career.  It was their first tour as full-time headlining act and their first to be profitable.

The live album Under a Blood Red Sky and the concert film U2 Live at Red Rocks: Under a Blood Red Sky both originated from performances on the tour. The latter matched U2's concert fervour with the spectacular natural setting of the Red Rocks Amphitheatre in the rain to produce a memorable document of the War Tour and to further increase the group's popularity; U2's filming of the Red Rocks show was later selected by Rolling Stone magazine as one of the "50 Moments that Changed the History of Rock and Roll".

Itinerary
After War had been recorded, but three months before it was released, U2 began playing the Pre-War Tour: 20 shows, and a television appearance, in halls in Western Europe, commencing on 1 December 1982 in Glasgow and finishing in the band's home town, Dublin, on 24 December. These shows generally featured only three songs from the upcoming album – "Sunday Bloody Sunday", "New Year's Day", and "Surrender". The 20 December performance in Belfast's Maysfield Leisure Centre represented the first airing of "Sunday Bloody Sunday" in Northern Ireland; lead singer Bono told the crowd, "We're going to do a song for you now. If you don't like it, we'll never play it again. It's called 'Sunday Bloody Sunday'." The reception was positive, and the song stayed in. Subsequent introductions would explicitly clarify the song's purpose: "This song is not a rebel song, this song is 'Sunday Bloody Sunday'!"

On 26 February 1983 at Caird Hall in Dundee, Scotland, the War Tour proper began, with the album's release coming two days later. The band played 29 shows and three television appearances in Scotland, England, and Wales, ending on 3 April with a single continental show at the Printemps de Bourges in Bourges, France. Three or four additional songs from War were added to these set lists, including "Two Hearts Beat As One", and the band started their 1980's practice of ending shows with the War song, "40".

The next leg went to North America for 48 shows and two radio appearances, beginning on 23 April in Chapel Hill, North Carolina and ending on 26 June at the Hudson River Park Pier 84 facility in New York City.  The War Tour was U2's first as a full-time headlining act. Most of the venues were colleges and smaller auditoriums, but they played a few arena shows, such as at the Centrum in Worcester, Massachusetts and at the Los Angeles Sports Arena.  Many of the shows featured the Welsh band The Alarm as the opening act.

During this tour, they appeared before one of the largest audiences in US music history: on Memorial Day at the US Festival in San Bernardino, California, they appeared at noontime on the third day of the festival before a crowd of over 125,000. The festival was broadcast live on MTV. The performance climaxed in a grand finale where Bono scaled the proscenium of the US festival's huge stage while singing the song "The Electric Co.", ending up about 100 feet above the ground.

A week later, their 5 June 1983 performance at Red Rocks Amphitheatre (an outdoor venue near Morrison, Colorado in the foothills of the Rocky Mountains that many travelling musicians consider the most spectacular outdoor venue in the United States) was recorded for what turned out to be a live album entitled Under a Blood Red Sky and concert film entitled Live at Red Rocks: Under a Blood Red Sky. A steady rain and the surreal, torch-lit natural beauty of the surroundings combined to present U2's performance in the most dramatic of contexts. Frequently shown on MTV, the video helped to further expand the band's American audience and rewarded the large financial risk the show had represented. The album used performances culled from the Red Rocks show as well as a 6 May show in Boston's Orpheum Theatre and a 20 August show in St. Goarshausen, West Germany at the Lorelei Amphitheatre. The Orpheum Theatre performance was also recorded and broadcast on the King Biscuit Flower Hour syndicated radio program.

U2 then played at 5 outdoor summer festivals in Western Europe in July and August.

After a nearly three-month interlude, U2 played a show in Honolulu, Hawaii, before their first tour of Japan for six shows, with the tour ending on 30 November 1983 at the Nakano Sun Plaza in Tokyo. While in Japan, U2 made two television appearances, one of which featured a performance of "New Year's Day" in which Edge performed almost entirely on piano due to a guitar failure.

Shows and reception
In both UK and US publicity for the tour, the group emphasised that it opposed "wallpaper music" from artists who spent more time on their hairdos than anything else. In the US, advertisements for the tour read "U2 Declare War" and talked about "The War on Boring Music", especially in the context of breaking up conservative radio formats. National identification also played a role; Bono said to US audiences variants of: "We're not just another English fashion band passing through. We're an Irish band and we're here to stay."

Wars music, its music videos, and the War Tour separated U2 from the mass of new wave or college rock acts and into mainstream rock visibility. Shows were typically 90 minutes long. Bono was emotional and very theatrical during shows; during songs he would climb lighting rigs, plunge into the audience, or walk out onto side balconies. As the tour progressed, band members and others became concerned that Bono's antics – while making for good press copy and having an electric effect on some fans – were detracting from the music and might end in a disaster (an assessment Bono later agreed with). "New Year's Day" became a hit single, and in concert performances were full of vitality, with The Edge rapidly switching back and forth between piano and electric guitar. Older songs such as "Gloria" and "11 O'Clock Tick Tock" were kept in the set list. "40"'s show-closing, thoughtful presence – wherein The Edge and bassist Adam Clayton swapped instruments, then three band members left one by one leaving only drummer Larry Mullen, Jr. – grew into an audience participation ritual that would continue even after the band had left the stage. At one show at Dublin's Phoenix Park Racecourse, the fans' singing of the refrain How long, to sing this song from the song went on for 15 minutes after the concert's end.

Initial British critical reaction to the first leg of the War Tour was favourable but with some reservations. The group was already well known there, and while War debuted at the top of the UK albums chart, it had encountered some early backlash, with NME saying "the great personal fury" of U2's early work had been replaced by "literal but sincere sloganeering". Sounds magazine said a Birmingham show had pacing and thematic problems due to "newer numbers clumsily breaking the mood that had earlier been created" but praised many other elements of the show, saying that "their skill at breaking down barriers between band and audience has never been better." Some poor notices for the album itself from the British pop weeklies upset Bono during the tour, and one from Sounds bothered him so much that insulted the reviewer by name during a show in Portsmouth.

U2's exciting concerts earned critical praise during the American leg, where the band had not been as well-known previously.  Both American audiences and American critics were more open than the British to the group's upfront emotional statements and theatricality. The New York Times John Rockwell wrote that: "This is a great live band. Bono is a riveting public personality, leaping and crawling all over the stage and above it into the scaffolding." The Boston Globe wrote that the group's performance "reached a rare, wondrous zone – where rock 'n' roll transcended the ordinary and took the audience on a lift that was equal parts spiritual and sensual." It said that Bono's vocals "sound like pleas and prayers, the lyrics failure and hope" and described The Edge's guitar playing as embodying "clear, ringing lines that were both atmospheric and jarring." The Oregonian wrote that it was "the best concert of 1983 so far: solid music played rhythmically and well, a positive stage attitude that recognised audience input, excellent sound and lights." The Village Voice wrote that U2 in concert evoked an "undeniable righteousness" about which "U2 was thrilled [and] their audience was thrilled". Journalist Rick Miller wrote of the opening US show in Chapel Hill, "There are no words for the warmth of the thrill that U2 gave the crowd. I surrendered and I know I'm not alone." Contemporary Christian Music magazine said that the show avoided typical juvenile stage patter clichés and that from a Christian perspective, "It is true that U2 doesn't preach, but that does not mean a message is not communicated."

Tickets were in demand in the US, spurred by word-of-mouth and the breakthrough of "New Year's Day" as a hit single there. Many of the War Tour shows sold out on the American leg. The group began booking bigger venues on the tour as a result. The tour helped War stay in or near the US albums chart Top 20 for the duration of that leg, which represented by far their best commercial performance so far in the United States. At the same time, the band had to deal with larger-scale success for the first time, with more of a distance between themselves and their audience and with the audience itself changing in nature. The group was being mobbed by fans at some locations and Bono became a sex symbol to female fans.

The tour grossed about $2 million overall and was their first venture on the road that was profitable.

Themes and legacy
The War Tour was the first U2 tour on which the lighting and stage design was done by Willie Williams, who would continue to perform that role in all of U2's subsequent tours. While originally hired for just lighting, Williams quickly became involved in all aspects of the group's visual presentation. Starting with the Pre-War Tour,  the minimalist stage design featured a red carpet-covered riser on which the drums and keyboards stood. Three large white flags were placed at the back of the stage, representing the notion of "surrender"; electric fans set the flags flying at designated moments in the show. Stage fog was also used in places. One newspaper review said that "Lighting was starkly beautiful for this concert, in tune with the occasional ominous tone of some of the songs."

During "Sunday Bloody Sunday", Bono would march waving a white flag around to illustrate his anti-war and anti-nationalist stances and spur audiences to shout, "No more! No war!" The white flags were also sometimes handed off the stage, where they would be passed around amongst the audience. Bono said that his "limited voice" compelled him to search for other ways to express a song's meaning, and here this was the "idea of a flag drained of all colour, the idea of surrender." This became the focal image of the tour, with Rolling Stone saying of the Red Rocks performance, "The sight of Bono singing the anti-violence anthem 'Sunday Bloody Sunday' while waving a white flag through crimson mist (created by a combination of wet weather, hot lights and the illumination of those crags) became the defining image of U2's warrior-rock spirit." So strong was the image that the group became somewhat ambivalent about it; years later, bassist Adam Clayton would say, "If you had to reduce U2 down to the waving of the white flag, which is a moment from the War Tour, that would be the worst thing. At the time, I think it was in the spirit of the performance. But we weren't very ironic people back then. We were pretty serious people, and we didn't see that we could have been a little more subtle about things like that. But hey, as mistakes go, that's probably not a bad one."

The move upward from clubs to halls to arenas that the War Tour spanned did not faze the group. This had been their plan, and Bono said, "If we stay in small clubs, we'll develop small minds, and then we'll start making small music." And early on, Bono had told Williams that someday the group would do "Pink Floyd-size shows." But the medium-sized venues of the War Tour were enough at the time; two decades later, the band's Red Rocks performance captured on Live at Red Rocks: Under a Blood Red Sky was included on Rolling Stones list of the "50 Moments that Changed the History of Rock and Roll".

Tour dates

Notes

References

External links
 U2.com on Pre-War Tour
 U2.com on War Tour
 u2tours.com on Pre-War, War Tours
 u2gigs.com on War Tour
 u2setlists.com on War Tour

1982 concert tours
1983 concert tours
U2 concert tours